Lambert Verdonk (born September 20, 1944) is a Dutch former international football striker.

Honours
Marseille
Division 1: 1971–72
Coupe de France: 1971–72

References

External links
 
 International stats
 Profile

1944 births
Living people
Dutch footballers
Netherlands international footballers
Association football forwards
PSV Eindhoven players
Sparta Rotterdam players
NEC Nijmegen players
Go Ahead Eagles players
Olympique de Marseille players
AC Ajaccio players
Ligue 1 players
Angoulême Charente FC players
Dutch expatriate footballers
Expatriate footballers in France
Sportspeople from Heerlen
Footballers from Limburg (Netherlands)
Dutch expatriate sportspeople in France